Polsloe Priory, also known as St Katherine's Priory, was a Benedictine priory for women (a nunnery) in Devon, England. It was founded in around 1159 on land to the east of Exeter, on a site that is now part of the city's suburb of Polsloe. At the time it was the only religious house for women in Devon, but two others were founded later: at Cornworthy and Canonsleigh Abbey. The first prioress of whom any record survives was Avelina in 1218. Amongst the holdings of the priory was the Church of St Mary, Marston Magna in Somerset.

In common with most other Catholic institutions, it was dissolved by Henry VIII, in 1539, even though it had paid a fine of £400 for exemption from the First Suppression Act of 1536. At dissolution it had 14 nuns, including the prioress and subprioress.

Most of the buildings have been demolished, but one remains, built of the local red sandstone and believed to date from around 1320. English Heritage have designated it a Grade II* listed building. As of 2016 it is used by the local community association for occasional events, having passed from private to City Council hands in 1934.

See also
 Exeter monastery

References

Sources

Further reading

Monasteries in Devon
Grade II* listed buildings in Devon
Buildings and structures in Exeter
History of Exeter
Benedictine nunneries in England
1159 establishments in England
Christian monasteries established in the 12th century
1539 disestablishments in England